General Paz Department is a  department of Corrientes Province in Argentina.

Settlements
Caá Catí
Itá Ibaté
Lomas de Vallejos
Palmar Grande
Tacuaral
Costa Santa Lucía

External links
Caa Cati website 

Departments of Corrientes Province